Cohen House may refer to:

in England
Cohen House, London, in Chelsea
 in Italy 
  Cohen House, Taormina , in Taormina Sicily. www.cohenhouse.it

in the United States
Alfred H. Cohen House, Oakland, California, listed on the National Register of Historic Places (NRHP) in Alameda County, California
Joseph Elliston House, Brentwood, Tennessee, also known as Cohen House, NRHP-listed
Cohen House (Petersburg, Virginia), listed on the NRHP in Petersburg, Virginia